Adam Frizzell (born 21 February 1998) is a Scottish professional footballer who plays as a winger for Scottish League One club Airdrieonians.

Career
On 17 October 2015, Frizzell debuted for Killie in a 2–0 win versus Inverness Caledonian Thistle.

On 30 March 2018, Frizzell moved on loan to Livingston until the end of May 2018.

On 31 August 2018, Frizzell moved on loan to Scottish Championship club Queen of the South in Dumfries until early January 2019. On 6 January 2018, Frizzell returned to Killie on completion of his loan spell having played in 13 matches for the Doonhamers.

He joined Scottish League One side Dumbarton on loan in October 2019. He scored twice on his debut in a 3–1 victory against Forfar Athletic.

Frizzell left Kilmarnock at the end of the 2019–20 season, with his contract having expired and signed permanently for Dumbarton on a short-term deal until January 2021 in October 2020 scoring the winner on his debut against Clyde. In January 2021, his contract was extended to the end of the season. He left the Sons in June 2021 to join League One rivals Airdrieonians.

International 

Selected for the Scotland under-20 squad in the 2017 Toulon Tournament. The team went to claim the bronze medal. It was the nations first ever medal at the competition.

Career statistics

References

External links

1998 births
Living people
Scottish footballers
Kilmarnock F.C. players
Livingston F.C. players
Scottish Professional Football League players
Footballers from Greenock
Association football forwards
Queen of the South F.C. players
Dumbarton F.C. players
Airdrieonians F.C. players